Nay Band (also Romanized as Nāy Band, Naiband, and Ney Band; also known as Naibandān and Neyban) is a village in Kavir Rural District, Deyhuk District, Tabas County, South Khorasan Province, Iran. At the 2006 census, its population was 484, in 133 families.

References 

Populated places in Tabas County